Yann is a French male given name, specifically, the Breton form of "Jean" (French for "John").

Notable persons with the name Yann include:


In arts and entertainment
Yann Martel (born 1963), Canadian author
Yann Moix (born 1968), French author, film director and television presenter
Yann Peifer (born 1974), German disc-jockey
Yann Queffélec (born 1949), French author
Yann Tiersen (born 1970), French musician
Yann Tomita (born 1952), Japanese musician

In politics and activism
Yann Fouéré (1910–2011), French activist, Breton nationalist
Yann Goulet (1914–1999), French activist, Breton nationalist
Yann Wehrling (born 1971), French politician

In sports
Yann Bodiger (born 1995), French footballer
Yann Boé-Kane (born 1991), French footballer
Yann Clairay (born 1983), French racing driver
Yann Cucherat (born 1979), French gymnast
Yann Danis (born 1981), Canadian ice hockey player
Yann David (born 1988), French rugby union player
Yann Delaigue (born 1973), French rugby union player
Yann Ekra (born 1990), French-Ivorian footballer
Yann Jouffre (born 1984), French footballer
Yann Kermorgant (born 1981), French footballer
Yann Lachuer (born 1972), French footballer
Yann Lesgourgues (born 1991), French rugby union player
Yann M'Vila (born 1990), French footballer
Yann Marti (born 1998), Swiss tennis player
Yann Rolim (born 1995), Brazilian footballer
Yann Sommer (born 1988), Swiss footballer
Yann Songo'o (born 1991), Cameroonian footballer

In other fields 
Yann Arthus-Bertrand (born 1946), French photographer
Yann LeCun (born 1960), French-American computer scientist

See also 
Idle Days on the Yann, a short story by Lord Dunsany
Tri Yann, a French band
Jan (name)

Breton masculine given names
French masculine given names